The 32 teams at the 2014 FIFA World Cup were split into eight groups of four, labelled A–H. Group A comprised Brazil, Croatia, Mexico and Cameroon. The first match was played on 12 June 2014, with the last two played concurrently on 23 June. The top two teams, Brazil and Mexico, advanced to the round of 16.

Teams

Notes

Standings

Brazil advanced to play Chile (runner-up of Group B) in the round of 16.
Mexico advanced to play Netherlands (winner of Group B) in the round of 16.

Matches

Brazil vs Croatia

The two teams had met in two previous matches, including in the 2006 FIFA World Cup group stage, won by Brazil 1–0. Croatia forward Mario Mandžukić was suspended for the match, after being sent off in the team's final qualifier against Iceland.

Croatia opened the scoring through a Marcelo own goal, as the ball bounced off him into the net after Nikica Jelavić deflected Ivica Olić's cross. Neymar equalised for the hosts with a  shot after receiving a pass from Oscar. In the second half, Brazil took the lead with Neymar's penalty after Dejan Lovren was controversially judged to have fouled Fred in the penalty area. Croatia had a potential equaliser disallowed, after a foul was again controversially called on the Brazilian goalkeeper, Júlio César. In added time, Oscar sealed the win, toe-poking the third goal for Brazil from  after receiving a pass from Ramires.

Post-match, FIFA referees chief Massimo Busacca defended the officials for awarding the penalty and insisted there had been some contact between Lovren and Fred, even if it was minimal. However, former top-level FIFA referee Markus Merk criticised FIFA for having Yuichi Nishimura as the referee in the opening match, labelling the refereeing in the match as "embarrassing".

The game was notable for a number of pioneering events. This was the first occasion in FIFA World Cup history on which an own goal (which was also the first ever own goal scored by Brazil in World Cup finals) opened scoring in the tournament. As the first game played at this World Cup, the match also saw the first use of vanishing spray to mark free kick spots, and the advent of goal-line technology, two innovations introduced during the tournament.

Mexico vs Cameroon

The two teams had met in one previous match, in a friendly in 1993, won by Mexico 1–0.

Mexico's Giovani dos Santos had two goals disallowed for offside in the first half.
However, replays showed that he was in line with the last defender for the first case, while the ball came from a Cameroon player for the second. In the second half, dos Santos had a shot saved by the Cameroon goalkeeper, Charles Itandje, but the ball rebounded into the path of Oribe Peralta, who slotted the ball into the empty net with his left foot.

Mexico captain Rafael Márquez made history by becoming the first player to captain his nation in four different World Cups. Samuel Eto'o also appeared in his fourth World Cup, joining fellow Cameroonians Jacques Songo'o and Rigobert Song as the only African players to have achieved the feat.

Brazil vs Mexico

The two teams had met in 38 previous matches, including three times in the FIFA World Cup group stage, all won by Brazil (1950: 4–0; 1954: 5–0; 1962: 2–0). Their most recent meeting was in the 2013 FIFA Confederations Cup group stage, won by Brazil 2–0.

Mexican goalkeeper Guillermo Ochoa made four outstanding saves to deny Brazil. In the first half, he saved a header from Neymar tight to his right to push the ball around the post, and blocked a close-range effort from Paulinho. In the second half, he saved a low shot from Neymar and a late point-blank header from Thiago Silva.

This was the first time since the 1970 FIFA World Cup that the host team drew 0–0 in the group stage. Mexico became the first team from outside UEFA or CONMEBOL to take a point from Brazil in the World Cup.

Cameroon vs Croatia

The two teams had never met before.

In a match where both teams needed at least a point to stay alive in the competition, Croatia opened scoring when Ivica Olić scored from close range from Ivan Perišić's pass. Just before half time, Cameroon was reduced to 10 men when Alex Song was dismissed for an off the ball incident with Mario Mandžukić. Perišić scored at the beginning of the second half when he intercepted Cameroonian goalkeeper Charles Itandje's goal kick and ran 50 yards before slotting in at the near post. Mandžukić scored the last two goals, the first a header from Danijel Pranjić's corner and the second a tap in after Itandje parried Eduardo's shot into his path. The result confirmed Cameroon's elimination from the tournament.

In a case of infighting, Cameroonian defender Benoît Assou-Ekotto was caught on camera head-butting teammate Benjamin Moukandjo. Song later apologised to Mandžukić and his country for his ejection, while Cameroonian coach Volker Finke said he was very disappointed with their performance.

On 1 July 2014, Cameroon officials announced that they had opened an investigation on claims that seven of the Cameroon's players were involved in fixing the result. However, FIFA said there was no evidence that there were any match fixing in any of Cameroon's matches.

Olić, who previously scored a goal in the 2002 World Cup, became the second player to have a 12-year gap between World Cup goals, after Michael Laudrup in 1986 and 1998. Mandžukić became the first Croatian player to score a brace in a World Cup game. The 4–0 scoreline was also the biggest win by Croatia in the World Cup.

Cameroon vs Brazil
The two teams had met in four previous matches, including in the 1994 FIFA World Cup group stage, won by Brazil 3–0. Their most recent meeting was in the 2003 FIFA Confederations Cup group stage, won by Cameroon 1–0. Cameroon midfielder Alex Song was suspended for the match (first match of a three-match ban), after being sent off in the previous match against Croatia.

Brazil, where a draw would guarantee their qualification to the knockout stage, opened the scoring in the 17th minute when Luiz Gustavo crossed from the left for Neymar to beat the goalkeeper with a first time low side-footed finish to the corner. Already-eliminated Cameroon equalised when Allan Nyom beat Dani Alves on the left before crossing for Joël Matip to finish from close range. Neymar put Brazil back in front when he collected the ball from Marcelo and ran at goal before finishing with a low right foot shot that wrong footed the goalkeeper from just inside the penalty area. In the second half David Luiz crossed from the left for Fred to extend Brazil's lead with a close range header before half-time substitute Fernandinho completed the scoring when he collected a pass from Oscar before finishing with a low right footed shot. The result assured that Brazil pipped Mexico on goal difference to qualify to the knockout stage as group winners.

The match was Brazil's 100th in the World Cup, and they followed Germany (which played their 100th match in their first game of the 2014 World Cup) to become the second team to reach the milestone.

Croatia vs Mexico

The two teams had met in three previous matches, including in the 2002 FIFA World Cup group stage, won by Mexico 1–0.

Coming into the final round of matches, Croatia needed to win to guarantee qualification to the knockout stage regardless of the result of Cameroon vs Brazil, while Mexico only needed a draw to do so. The game was goalless for the first 70 minutes, until a Héctor Herrera corner to the back post allowed Rafael Márquez to score from a header, outleaping the Croatian defenders. With Croatia progressing only by way of a win, they were caught out on a break a short time later where Andrés Guardado scored after receiving a pass from Oribe Peralta. Mexico scored their third goal when Márquez flicked on Guardado's corner with substitute Javier Hernández scoring at the back post. Ivan Perišić scored in his second consecutive World Cup match after a neat back pass from Ivan Rakitić to get a consolation goal for Croatia in the closing minutes of the game, before Croatia's Ante Rebić was sent off for a foul on Carlos Peña. Mexico qualified as group runners-up (behind Brazil on goal difference) on virtue of the win, while Croatia were eliminated.

With his goal, Márquez joined Cuauhtémoc Blanco as the only Mexican player to score in three World Cups.

References

External links

2014 FIFA World Cup Group A, FIFA.com

Group A
Group
Group
A
Cameroon at the 2014 FIFA World Cup